"British Bombs" is a song by English singer, songwriter, and musician Declan McKenna. It was released as single on 19 August 2019 through Sony Music Entertainment. The song was written by McKenna and produced by James Ford.

Background
McKenna said that "British Bombs" is about the hypocrisy of the British arms trade and DSEI, the weapons convention in London. "I think too often it's implied that matters in the world are too complex to not end up with war, or to not possess and sell weapons, and I just think it is pure bullshit," he told NME. "Not only do we still engage in wars far away from our homes, which settle nothing and fuel extremism in the aftermath, we sell weapons to other countries full well knowing where they end up. I wanted to write a song that was outright against war, in any form. Violence breeds violence and I just don't think the world is too complex to set a peaceful precedent, but it seems the business of war is what keeps happening. To say it's a shame feels like a huge understatement."

Music video
A music video to accompany the release of "British Bombs" was first released onto YouTube on 19 August 2019. The music video was directed by Ed Bulmer.

Personnel
Credits adapted from Tidal.
 James Ford – producer
 Declan McKenna – composer, lyricist, associated performer, piano, vocal
 Tom Herbert – assistant engineer
 Nathan Cox – bass
 Gabrielle King – drums
 Matt Jaggar – engineer
 Will Bishop – keyboards
 Kevin Tuffy – mastering engineer
 Alan Moulder – mixing engineer
 Caesar Edmunds – mixing engineer

Charts

Release history

See also
 List of anti-war songs

References

2019 songs
2019 singles
Declan McKenna songs
Song recordings produced by James Ford (musician)
Anti-war songs
Sony Music singles